Armenian Street may refer to:

Armenian Street in George Town, Penang, Malaysia
Armenian Street, Singapore in Singapore
Armenian Street, Chennai in India

See also
 List of places named after Armenia
 Little Armenia (disambiguation)
 Roads in Armenia
 Armenia Avenue, Tampa, Florida, USA